John B. Riley may refer to:

John Bernard Riley (born 1954), American jazz musician
John Riley (mayor) (born 1943/1944), American mayor